Murshidabad Assembly constituency is an assembly constituency in Murshidabad district in the Indian state of West Bengal.

Overview
As per orders of the Delimitation Commission, No. 64 Murshidabad Assembly constituency covers Murshidabad municipality, Jiaganj Azimganj municipality and Murshidabad Jiaganj community development block

Murshidabad Assembly constituency is part of No. 11 Murshidabad (Lok Sabha constituency).

Members of Legislative Assembly

Election results

2021

2011
In the 2011 election, Shaoni Singha Roy of Congress defeated her nearest rival Bibhas Chakraborty of Forward Bloc.

 

.# Congress did not contest the seat in 2006.

1977–2006
In the 2006 state assembly elections, Bivas Chakraborty of Forward Bloc won the Murshidabad assembly seat defeating his nearest rival Joyanta Roy of IPFB. Contests in most years were multi cornered but only winners and runners are being mentioned. Chhaya Ghosh of Forward Bloc defeated Abdul Mannan Hossain, Independent, in 2001. Mazammel Haque, Independent, defeated Abdul Ohab Mondal of Congress in 1996, Chhaya Ghosh of Forward Bloc defeated Asak Ali of Congress in 1991. Abdul Mannan Hossain of Congress defeated Madan Mohan Ray, Independent, in 1987. Chhaya Ghosh of Forward Bloc defeated Dedar Bakshi of ICS in 1982 and Syed Nawab Jani Meerza of Janata Party in 1977.

1951–1972
Mohammad Idris Ali of Congress won in 1972, 1971 and 1969. S.K.A.Mirza of Congress won in 1967. Birendra Narayan Ray, Independent, won in 1962. Durgapada Sinha of Congress won in 1957 and in independent India's first election in 1951.

References

Assembly constituencies of West Bengal
Politics of Murshidabad district
Murshidabad